The 142nd Pennsylvania House of Representatives District is located in Southeastern Pennsylvania and has been represented since 2023 by Joe Hogan.

District profile
The 142nd Pennsylvania House of Representatives District is located in Bucks County. It includes the Joseph Richardson House. It is made up of the following areas:

Langhorne
Langhorne Manor
Lower Southampton Township 
Middletown Township (PART)
 District Lower [PART, Divisions 02, 05, 08, 10 and 12]
 District Upper
Upper Southampton Township

Representatives

Recent election results

References

External links
District map from the United States Census Bureau
Pennsylvania House Legislative District Maps from the Pennsylvania Redistricting Commission.  
Population Data for District 142 from the Pennsylvania Redistricting Commission.

Government of Bucks County, Pennsylvania
142